The High Commissioner from New Zealand to Vanuatu is New Zealand's foremost diplomatic representative in the Republic of Vanuatu, and in charge of New Zealand's diplomatic mission in Vanuatu.

The High Commission is located in Port Vila, Vanuatu's capital city.  New Zealand has maintained a resident High Commissioner in Vanuatu since 1987.

As fellow members of the Commonwealth of Nations, diplomatic relations between New Zealand and Vanuatu are at governmental level, rather than between Heads of State.  Thus, the countries exchange High Commissioners, rather than ambassadors.

List of heads of mission

High Commissioners to Vanuatu

Non-resident High Commissioners, resident in the Solomon Islands
 Mary Chamberlin (1980–1983)
 Rodney Denham (1983–1986)
 Alison Pearce (1986–1987)

Resident High Commissioners
 Tony Browne (1987–1990)
 Caroline Forsyth (1990–1993)
 Brian Smythe (1993–1996)
 Caroline McDonald (1996–1999)
 Rob Taylor (1999–2001)
 Brian Smythe (2001–2005)
 Paul Willis (2005 - )
 Georgina Roberts (2016 - 2018)
 Jonathan Schwass (2018 - 2021)
 Nicola (Nicci) Simmonds (2022 - )

References
 Heads of Missions List: V.  New Zealand Ministry of Foreign Affairs and Trade.  Retrieved on 2006-07-08.

Vanuatu, High Commissioners from New Zealand to
High Commissioners
New Zealand and the Commonwealth of Nations
Vanuatu and the Commonwealth of Nations
New Zealand